Stefan Sittig (born in Washington, D.C., United States) is an American theatre director, choreographer, educator, performer and podcast host.

Biography
Although born in the U.S., Sittig's mother is Uruguayan and he was raised in Rio de Janeiro, Brazil.

In New York, Sittig created choreography for the rock musical, Jessie at The Chelsea Playhouse and Who Is Earth Mae? at Theatre Row - 42nd Street. In the DC area he has choreographed Urinetown and The Mystery of Edwin Drood for Workhouse Arts Center, Man of La Mancha for The Washington Savoyards, Noël & Gertie for MetroStage, Polaroid Stories for Studio Theatre, Jesus Christ Superstar for Open Circle Theatre, Dorothy Meets Alice and Winnie The Pooh for Adventure Theatre, Flora The Red Menace for 1st Stage, Hollywood Pinafore for The American Century Theater and many others.  
 
Stefan is an Artistic Associate at MetroStage where he has directed, choreographed or appeared in several productions including Volver/Return (which he also devised), Poetry & Tango (featuring poetry by Pablo Neruda and music by Quintango), Jason Odell Williams’ fast-paced dramedy Church & State, Terrence McNally's Mothers & Sons and Frankie and Johnny (Broadway World Award for Best Director and Best Play) and Sheridan Morley's musical Noel & Gertie. 

Other directing credits include Trabajadores (the World Premiere of the Spanish version of Stephen Schwartz's Working), Cole Porter's Anything Goes and Red Hot & Cole, Jerry Herman's Jerry’s Girls and, the 60's revue Beehive.  

He directed and choreographed Douglas Carter Beane's Xanadu for Workhouse Arts Center receiving a Helen Hayes Award nomination and 12 Broadway World Award nominations including for Best Director and Best Choreographer.

As a performer, he has appeared at The Kennedy Center, Signature Theatre, Studio Theatre, Olney Theatre Center, The Barksdale Theatre, Theatre IV, Theatre Virginia, The Actor's Theatre of Washington and Heritage Repertory Theatre.  In more than 25 years in the theatre, he has appeared onstage or worked with Angela Lansbury, George Hearn, Tina Fey, Savion Glover, Christina Hendricks, Marvin Hamlisch, Jason George, Zachary Knighton, Florence Lacey, Natascia Diaz, Judy McLane, Betty Ann Grove and Helen Carey.

He produces and hosts the podcast American Theatre Artists Online, where he interviews leading contemporary figures in American Theatre including several Tony Award, Golden Globe Award and Emmy Award winners and nominees.

Sittig holds a BA from the University of Virginia, and an MFA in Theatre from Virginia Commonwealth University.

References

External links
 Website

1972 births
Living people
American theatre directors
American choreographers
University of Virginia alumni
Virginia Commonwealth University alumni